Jaroszewicz is a Polish surname. Notable people with the surname include:

 Hans Jaroszewicz (1935–2003), German cyclist
 Paweł Jaroszewicz (born 1985), Polish drummer
 Piotr Jaroszewicz (1909–1992), Polish politician

Polish-language surnames